Rock and Rail  is a short line railroad operating in southern Colorado that is currently a subsidiary of Martin Marietta Materials. The company began operations in July 1988.

References

External links
 Official website

Colorado railroads
Spin-offs of the Union Pacific Railroad